Baghestan Rural District may refer to:
 Baghestan Rural District (Fars Province)
 Baghestan Rural District (South Khorasan Province)